When Billie Beat Bobby is a 2001 American sports comedy-drama television film written and directed by Jane Anderson that details the historic 1973 "The Battle of the Sexes" tennis match between Billie Jean King and Bobby Riggs and what led up to it. It aired on ABC on April 16, 2001. The match was filmed at the Great Western Forum in Inglewood, California.

At the 53rd Primetime Emmy Awards, Holly Hunter was nominated for Outstanding Lead Actress in a Miniseries or Movie but lost out to Judy Davis who won for Life with Judy Garland: Me and My Shadows.

Cast
Holly Hunter as Billie Jean King
Ron Silver as Bobby Riggs
Matt Letscher as Lawrence King
Bob Gunton as Jerry Perenchio
Jacqueline McKenzie as Margaret Court
Elizabeth Berridge as Rosie Casals
Fred Willard as Howard Cosell
 Caitlin Martin as Chris Evert
Vincent Van Patten as Lornie Kuhle
Patrick Kerr as Rheo
Sal Viscuso as Sports Writer Mike
Stockard Channing as Narrator (uncredited)
Rainn Wilson as Dennis Van De Meer

See also
Battle of the Sexes (2017 film)
List of television films produced for American Broadcasting Company

References

External links
 

2001 television films
2001 films
2001 comedy-drama films
2000s sports comedy-drama films
Alliance Atlantis films
American Broadcasting Company original programming
American comedy-drama television films
2000s English-language films
American films based on actual events
American sports comedy-drama films
Billie Jean King
Comedy-drama films based on actual events
Cultural depictions of American men
Cultural depictions of American women
Cultural depictions of tennis players
Films directed by Jane Anderson
Films set in 1973
Films with screenplays by Jane Anderson
Sports films based on actual events
Sports television films
Television films based on actual events
Tennis films
2000s American films